Sergei Sergeyevich Gurchenkov (born 1 May 1983) is a Russian professional football coach and a former player.

Club career
He made his professional debut in the Russian Second Division in 1999 for FC Spartak-d Moscow.

Honours
 Russian Premier League champion: 2000.

References

1983 births
Footballers from Moscow
Living people
Russian footballers
Association football midfielders
FC Spartak Moscow players
FC Saturn Ramenskoye players
FC Znamya Truda Orekhovo-Zuyevo players
Russian Premier League players
FC Spartak-2 Moscow players